New Lisbon is an unincorporated community located within Pemberton Township in Burlington County, New Jersey, United States. It is a settlement along Four Mile Road (County Route 646) where it intersects Mount Misery Road (CR 645). The community is located along the Philadelphia and Long Branch Railway, later a part of the Pennsylvania Railroad, and featured a train station.

New Lisbon Developmental Center
The New Lisbon Developmental Center (NLDC) is a healthcare facility for male and female developmentally disabled persons, located on a  tract of land in New Lisbon, on Route 72 in the New Jersey Pine Barrens. The facilities include several residential living units, a health services center, recreational facilities, an eatery, maintenance buildings and a thrift store.

Transportation

References

External links
New Lisbon Developmental Center

Pemberton Township, New Jersey
Populated places in the Pine Barrens (New Jersey)
Unincorporated communities in Burlington County, New Jersey
Unincorporated communities in New Jersey